Vocea Basarabiei is a Romanian language radio station in Moldova.

History 

Vocea Basarabiei was launched on 18 June 2000 in Nisporeni. The Audiovisual Coordinating Council refused in 2002 and 2003 to register Vocea Basarabiei. On 15 January 2005 the station began to broadcast from Chişinău.

The radio station is broadcasting in Chişinău on 71.57; in Nisporeni on 105.7; in Glodeni on 100.3; in Taraclia on 101.9; in Soroca on 67.69 and 103.1; in Drochia and Pelinia on 101.0; in Ştefan Vodă on 103.8; in Căuşeni on 91.9; Vulcăneşti on 106.7; Rezina on 101.9; Străşeni on 102.3; Glodeni on 101.3; Satelit - Eutelsat: 11 111.1280 MH

Notable people 
 Valeriu Saharneanu 
 Petru Bogatu
 Dan Dungaciu
 Valeriu Matei
 Veaceslav Țâbuleac
 Nicolae Negru
 Aurelian Silvestru
 Petru Hadârcă
 Victor Rusu
 Arcadie Gherasim
 Mihai Stolnic
 Vitalie Enache
 Stela Popa
 Vlad Lupan
 Victor Cobăsneanu

External links  
 Vocea Basarabiei

Notes

Euronova Media Group
Romanian-language radio stations in Moldova
Nisporeni
Mass media in Chișinău